Konstantin Viktorovich Fishman (born 17 December 1977) is a Russian former professional footballer.

Club career
Born in Tyumen, Fishman began playing football in the youth academy of local club Dynamo-Gazovik Tyumen. Manager Vyacheslav Malofeev gave Fishman his professional debut at age 16 during the 1994 Russian Premier League season.

Fishman's father, Viktor, and brother, Sergey, were also footballers. Sergey played in the Russian Second Division with Irtysh Tobolsk.

References

1977 births
People from Tyumen
Living people
Russian footballers
Russia under-21 international footballers
Association football midfielders
FC Tyumen players
FC Rostov players
Russian Premier League players
FC Irtysh Omsk players
Sportspeople from Tyumen Oblast